Eater may refer to:
 Eater (band), an English punk rock group
 "Eater" (Fear Itself), a 2008 episode of the NBC television horror anthology Fear Itself
 Eater (novel), a 2000 science fiction novel by Gregory Benford
 Eater (website), a daily online culinary news publication from Vox Media

See also
 Eating, the ingestion of food
 Eaters (disambiguation)